Presidente Tancredo Neves is a municipality in the state of Bahia in Brazil. The population is 28,004 (2020 est.) in an area of 417.20 km². The town is named after Tancredo Neves, elected president of Brazil in 1985.

References

External links
http://www.citybrazil.com.br/ba/prestancredoneves/

Municipalities in Bahia